FIBA Asia is a zone within the International Basketball Federation (FIBA) which contains all 44 Asian FIBA federations.

Zones
 Central Asia Basketball Association (CABA)
 East Asia Basketball Association (EABA)
 Gulf Basketball Association (GBA)
 South Asia Basketball Association (SABA)
 Southeast Asia Basketball Association (SEABA)
 West Asia Basketball Association (WABA)

Member associations

Tournaments

Organized by FIBA Asia

National teams 
 FIBA Asia Cup – since 2017, also includes FIBA Oceania members
 FIBA Asia Women's Cup  – since 2017, also includes FIBA Oceania members
 FIBA Asia Challenge
 FIBA Asia Nations League
 Youth championships
 FIBA Asia Under-18 Championship - since 2018, also includes FIBA Oceania members
 FIBA Asia Under-18 Championship for Women - since 2018, also includes FIBA Oceania members
 FIBA Asia Under-16 Championship - since 2018, also includes FIBA Oceania members
 FIBA Asia Under-16 Championship for Women - since 2017, also includes FIBA Oceania members
 Former youth championships
 FIBA Asia Under-20 Championship
 FIBA Asia Under-20 Championship for Women

Clubs 
 FIBA Asia Champions Cup
 East Asia Super League
 West Asia Super League

Organized by FIBA Asia subzones

National teams 
 Central Asian Basketball Championship
 East Asia Basketball Championship
 Gulf Basketball Championship
 SABA Championship
 SEABA Championship
 West Asian Basketball Championship

Clubs 
 ASEAN Basketball League 
 WABA Champions Cup

Other pan-Asian tournaments

National teams 
 Asian Games basketball tournament
 East Asian Games basketball tournament
 FIBA Stanković Continental Champions' Cup (held in China)
 Southeast Asian Games basketball tournament
 West Asian Games basketball tournament
 William Jones Cup (held in Taipei, Taiwan)

Current title holder

Men

Women

FIBA World Rankings

Overview

Performances 
 Doesn't include classification rounds

Summer Olympics, men

Summer Olympics, women

FIBA Basketball World Cup

See also 
 Sports in Asia

References

External links 
 FIBA Asia official website

Asia
 
Sports organizations established in 1960